Space Gun is the 26th studio album by American indie rock band Guided by Voices. It was released on March 23, 2018 under Guided by Voices, Inc.

This album was recorded and mixed by Travis Harrison at Serious Business Music, NY, and Stillwater River Lodge

Critical reception
Space Gun was met with "generally favorable" reviews from critics. At Metacritic, which assigns a weighted average rating out of 100 to reviews from mainstream publications, this release received an average score of 77, based on 12 reviews. Aggregator Album of the Year gave the release a 73 out of 100 based on a critical consensus of 11 reviews.

Track listing

Personnel
 Robert Pollard – lead and backing vocals
 Doug Gillard – guitar, backing vocals on "Sport Component National"
 Bobby Bare Jr. – guitar
 Mark Shue – bass guitar, backing vocals on "Sport Component National"
 Kevin March – drums

References 

Guided by Voices albums
2018 albums